"Mycolicibacter sinensis" (formerly "Mycobacterium sinense") is a species of bacteria from the phylum Actinomycetota that was isolated from a human manifesting tuberculosis-like disease. It is susceptible to ethambutol but is resistant to most other anti-tuberculosis drugs. It has also been isolated from domestic and wild animals.

References

Acid-fast bacilli
sinensis
Bacteria described in 2013